"Baby Baby Baby" is a song by English singer and songwriter Joss Stone from her third studio album, Introducing Joss Stone (2007). It was written by Stone, Danny P and Jonathan Shorten, while production was handled by Raphael Saadiq. The song was released on 23 December 2007 as the album's third and final single. On 29 September 2009, a self-produced music video was leaked onto YouTube.

Stone performed the song at the Swarovski Fashion Rocks at the Royal Albert Hall in London on 18 October 2007, in aid of The Prince's Trust, as well as at the Austin City Limits Music Festival at Zilker Park in Austin, Texas, on 14 September 2007.

Background
During an interview with Harp, Stone said of the song:

Critical reception
IndieLondon.co.uk gave the song a four-star rating, calling it a "welcome return for Joss Stone to the type of retro-heavy territory that first made her standout on the Soul Sessions LP." Digital Spy's Nick Levine rated the song three stars, deeming it "a lithe, sparky old-school soul workout on which Stone proclaims her love for the man her 'heart demaaands'", adding that "[h]er terrific voice never has anything very interesting to say."

Music video
On 29 September 2009, the music video was leaked onto YouTube. It was produced by Stone herself without help from EMI. The video was described as "the worst video of all time" by Marie Claire in 2010.

Commercial performance
The song become Stone's first single not to enter the UK Singles Chart, but it did peak at No. 8 on the UK R&B Chart.

Track listings
UK digital download 1
"Baby Baby Baby" (UK Radio Mix) – 3:26
"Baby Baby Baby" (Relentless Club Mix) – 3:45
 
UK CD single and digital download 2
"Baby Baby Baby" (UK Radio Mix) – 3:23
"L-O-V-E" (Long Version) – 2:48

Credits and personnel
Credits adapted from the liner notes of Introducing Joss Stone.

 Joss Stone – lead vocals, songwriting
 Jawara Adams – trumpet
 Chalmers "Spanky" Alford – guitar
 Mike Boden – assistant engineering
 Oswald Bowe – assistant engineering
 Chuck Brungardt – mixing, recording
 Priscilla Jones Campbell – backing vocals
 Tom Coyne – mastering
 Reggie Dozier – string recording
 Steve Greenwell – vocal recording
 Lionel Holoman – Wurlitzer
 Justin Kessler – Pro Tools operator
 Mix Master Mike – turntablism

 Robert Ozuna – percurssion
 Danny P – songwriting
 Khari Parker – drums
 Tino Richardson – saxophone
 Raphael Saadiq – backing vocals, bass, guitar, horn arrangements, production
 Ian Shea – assistant engineering
 Jonathan Shorten – songwriting
 Luke Smith – assistant engineering
 Scott Somerville – assistant engineering
 Glenn Standridge – mixing, recording
 Charlie Stavish – assistant engineering
 Benjamin Wright – string arrangements

Charts

Release history

References

2007 singles
2007 songs
Joss Stone songs
Relentless Records singles
Song recordings produced by Raphael Saadiq
Songs written by Joss Stone
Songs written by Jonathan Shorten